John bar Aphtonia (c.480–537) was a Syriac monk of the Miaphysite persuasion who founded the monastery of Qenneshre ("Eagle's Nest") around 530. A key figure in the transmission of Greek thought and literary culture into a Syriac milieu, his monastery became the intellectual centre of the West Syriac world for the next three centuries.

John was born in Edessa and raised by his mother, Aphtonia. (His surname means "son of Aphtonia".) His father was a rhetor. John himself was bilingual in both the Syriac language and Greek. At the age of fifteen he was sent to the monastery of Saint Thomas in Seleucia Pieria near Antioch. Sometime between 528 and 531, he left with several other Miaphysite-leaning monks facing persecution from the pro-Chalcedonian imperial authorities. They established the monastery of Qenneshre on the banks of the Euphrates near Jarabulus and elected John as their first abbot. According to the historian Zacharias Rhetor, John was part of the Miaphysite delegation that negotiated with the Emperor Justinian I in Constantinople around 531.

A Syriac biography of John was written after his death by a monk of Qenneshre. John himself wrote in both Greek and Syriac. Among his surviving works are hymns; a commentary on the Song of Songs, which survives only in excerpts in catenae; and a biography of Severus of Antioch. His Greek hymns were often associated with the hymns of Severus. They were translated into Syriac a century later by Paul of Edessa, another monk of Qenneshre.

Notes

Bibliography

5th-century births
537 deaths
People from Edessa
6th-century Byzantine monks
Syrian Christian monks
Oriental Orthodox monks
Christian abbots
Christian hagiographers
Christian hymnwriters
Bible commentators